Piau is a municipality in the state of Minas Gerais in the Southeast region of Brazil.

History

At the end of the eighteenth century, those who had been involved in the Inconfidência Mineira were heavily persecuted by the Portuguese Crown. These men (among them was Francisco José da Silva, uncle of Tiradentes) became fugitives searching for new places to make a new life.

The place they found was set in a vast forest by a river which rises in the Serra da Mantiqueira. The settlers gave this river the name of Rio Piau because of a large amount of fish of this species (leporinus piau?).

The first chapel was built in honour of the Holy Spirit, and the town was named Divino Espírito Santo de Piau. In place of the old chapel there is now the parish church of the Holy Spirit.

The District was created on July 22, 1868. belonging to the municipalities of Ouro Preto, Barbacena, Mar de Espanha, Rio Pomba, Juiz de Fora, São João Nepomuceno and Rio Novo. On December 12, 1953 Piau became a municipality in its own right.

Tourism
The main attractions in this small municipality include the countryside, the church, old houses and farms, and since 1984 the banana festival which occurs annually in the second week of July.

Economy
The principal crop is banana and the greater part of the production is sold in Juiz de Fora and its locality.

See also
List of municipalities in Minas Gerais

References

Municipalities in Minas Gerais